Stonewall W. "Stoney" Jackson (born Alwyn Jackson on February 27, 1960) is an American actor. Jackson was born in Richmond, Virginia.

Career 
He was featured in numerous teen magazines in the 1970s and 1980s, including Right On, Teen Beat, and Tiger Beat. Jackson played a baseball player in the 1994 Disney film Angels in the Outfield. He portrayed high school basketball player Jesse Mitchell on the ensemble series The White Shadow, and Travis Fillmore on the sitcom 227. He played Black Jack Savage in the pilot episode of The 100 Lives of Black Jack Savage. He also has made guest appearances on shows like Hardcastle and McCormick and  Everybody Hates Chris.

Stoney Jackson was one of the more visible dancers in the iconic music video for Michael Jackson's "Beat It". He appeared in the video for Dan Hartman's "I Can Dream About You" as the lead vocalist of the fictional group "The Sorels" from the Walter Hill film Streets of Fire, in which he appeared. Hill would later cast Jackson again in Trespass and Wild Bill. In 1985, he co-starred in the short-lived crime series, "The Insiders," as James Mackey. In 1997, he appeared with John Lafayette and Kyla Pratt in the Season 5, Episode 22 of Walker, Texas Ranger.

Jackson also appeared in the film CB4, with Chris Rock and Allen Payne, as Wacky Dee, a take-off on dance-oriented rappers like Freedom Williams and MC Hammer. He performed the song "Dance" in the film.

Jackson portrayed the supervillain The Gangster Prankster in Roger Corman's 1997 movie Black Scorpion II and reprises the role in the 2001 Black Scorpion (TV series).

Kool Keith's album Spankmaster (2001) features a track named "Stoney Jackson," and Strong Arm Steady's second album is titled In Search of Stoney Jackson (2010).

Personal life 

Stoney Jackson resides in the Orange County area of southern California. He has a family that consists of his wife and two children. He now works as an LA producer with Everlert.

Music video appearances
 1983 Michael Jackson - "Beat It"
 1984 Dan Hartman - "I Can Dream About You" (version 1)
 1984 Penny Ford - "Change Your Wicked Ways"

References

External links 
 

1960 births
African-American male actors
American male film actors
American male television actors
Living people
Male actors from Richmond, Virginia
20th-century American male actors
21st-century American male actors
21st-century African-American people
20th-century African-American people